Elis is an eponymous album from Brazilian singer Elis Regina, released in 1980. It was the last studio album released by the singer before her death in January 1982.

Track listing
Sai Dessa (Natan Marques, Ana Terra) 2:13
Rebento (Gilberto Gil) 5:13
Nova Estação (Luiz Guedes, Thomas Roth) 3:25
O Medo de Amar É O Medo de Ser Livre (Fernando Brant, Roberto Guedes)  4:29
Aprendendo a Jogar (Guilherme Arantes) 4:14
Só Deus É Quem Sabe (Guilherme Arantes) 3:59
O Trem Azul (Renato Bastos, Lô Borges) 4:36
Vento de Maio (feat. Lô Borges)/Um Girassol da Cor de Seu Cabelo (Lô Borges) 3:29
Calcanhar de Aquiles (Jean Garfunkel, Paulo Garfunkel) 3:16
Se Eu Quiser Falar Com Deus (Gilberto Gil) 4:17

References

1980 albums
Elis Regina albums